The Suite for Variety Orchestra (circa 1956) is a suite in eight movements by Dmitri Shostakovich. The work consists of a collection of movements which derive from other works by the composer. It is also named Suite for Variety Stage Orchestra, for example in Derek Hulme's Shostakovich catalogue.

For many years the Suite for Variety Orchestra was misidentified as the lost Suite for Jazz Orchestra No. 2 (1938), a different work in three movements that was lost during World War II, the piano score of which was rediscovered in 1999 by Manashir Yakubov, and orchestrated the following year by Gerard McBurney.

Instrumentation

The work is scored for an orchestra of 2 flutes (with piccolo), an oboe, 2 (optionally 4) clarinets, 2 alto saxophones, 2 tenor saxophones (the first tenor doubling on soprano saxophone), a bassoon, 3 horns, 3 trumpets, 3 trombones, a tuba, timpani, 3 percussionists (with triangle, tambourine, side drum, bass drum, cymbal, suspended cymbal, glockenspiel, xylophone and vibraphone), harp, 2 pianos (one doubling celesta), accordion, guitar and strings.

Movements

According to a note by the composer, any number of the pieces may be played, and in any order.  The order of movements given in the New Collected Works of Dmitri Shostakovich series is as follows:

Background

The Suite was first performed in a Western country on 1 December 1988 in Barbican Hall, London, conducted by Mstislav Rostropovich, under the title Suite for Jazz Orchestra No. 2.

The work was recorded by Riccardo Chailly conducting the Royal Concertgebouw Orchestra in 1991 (also erroneously identified as the Jazz Suite No. 2), and released on a disc entitled Shostakovich: The Jazz Album (Decca 33702). The movements on that recording were ordered 1, 5, 2, 6, 4, 7, 3, 8.  Chailly's recording of the Waltz 2 movement was used on the soundtrack to the 1999 Stanley Kubrick film Eyes Wide Shut, as the opening title and closing credit theme, as well as in the A&E Network series A Nero Wolfe Mystery (the episode "Champagne for One").

It is thought that the Suite for Variety Orchestra must have been assembled by Shostakovich at least post-1956, because of the use of material from that year's music to the film The First Echelon.  In fact, the greater part of the Suite for Variety Orchestra is recycled material:

 The opening and closing movements (March and Finale) are based on the "March" from Korzinkina’s Adventures, Op. 59 (1940).
 The second movement (Dance 1) was adapted from "The Market Place" (No. 16) from the film score for The Gadfly, Op. 97 (1955).
 The third movement (Dance 2) goes back to "Invitation to a Rendezvous" (No. 20), from The Limpid Stream, Op. 39 (1934–35) [which itself was taken from "Mime and Dance of the Pope" (No. 19) from The Bolt, Op. 27 (1930–31)].
 The seventh movement (Waltz 2) was adapted from the Waltz (eighth movement) from the Suite from 'The First Echelon''', Op. 99a (1956).

In popular culture
In addition to the film Eyes Wide Shut, the music was featured in the films Bad Santa and Batman v Superman: Dawn of Justice, as well as in the television series Mr. Robot, Altered Carbon, A Nero Wolfe Mystery and House of Cards'' (2013).

It has also been used in advertisements for Sprint Nextel, Heineken, and Lincoln Motor Company.

References

External links
Publisher's page of the Suite for Variety Orchestra
Sikorski's Shostakovich Catalogue
concert programme notes about the Suite
DSCH
Introduction to "Dmitri Shostakovich: Jazz Suites" by Classic FM

Variety Orchestra